Juozas Žebrauskas (31 August 1904 – 14 May 1933) was a Lithuanian footballer who competed in the 1924 Summer Olympics.

Žebrauskas was a forward for ŠŠ Kovas Kaunas when he got called up to represent Lithuania at the 1924 Summer Olympics in Paris, France, they lost in the first round against Switzerland 0-9, afterwards he played four international friendlies and was never on the winning side.

References

1904 births
1933 deaths
Lithuanian footballers
Lithuania international footballers
Footballers at the 1924 Summer Olympics
Olympic footballers of Lithuania
Association football forwards